Wheelhouse is an English-language surname. Notable people with the surname include:
 Alan Wheelhouse (1934–1998), English first-class cricketer
 Ben Wheelhouse (1902–1985), English footballer
 Grant Wheelhouse (20th century), Australian rugby league player
 Jobe Wheelhouse (born 1985), Australian soccer player
 Mary Wheelhouse (1868–1947), British painter, illustrator, toymaker and suffragette
 Paul Wheelhouse (born 1970), Scottish politician
 Samuel Wheelhouse (born 1994), British inventor and engineer
 Sidney Wheelhouse (1888–1916), English footballer
 William St James Wheelhouse (1821–1886), British barrister and politician